Hannah Daniel (born 20 January 1986) is a Welsh actress from Cardiff, Wales, best known for her roles on TV series Hinterland, Keeping Faith and Holby City.

Early life
Hannah Daniel was born in Heath Hospital and raised in Whitchurch, Cardiff. She attended Ysgol Gyfun Gymraeg Glantaf and later read English literature at University College London, By age 24, she was a S4C presenter.

Georgia Lee and Daniel wrote and directed (You Have Reached Your) DESTINATION, about a 29 year old Uber driver's pregnancy.

Personal life

Daniel lives in Crystal Palace, London, with her partner, the actor Richard Harrington. Daniel and Harrington worked together for all three series of the dual-language crime drama Hinterland / Y Gwyll (aired 2013-2016), where every scene was shot first in Welsh and then in English. Each of the two productions was then compiled and aired as a separate three-series programme. Harrington appeared as the lead actor, DCI Tom Mathias, and Daniel played one of his subordinates, DS Siân Owens. They have a son together, who was born in 2019.

Filmography

Television

Film

References

External links
official

1986 births
Living people
Welsh television actresses
Welsh soap opera actresses
21st-century Welsh actresses
People educated at Ysgol Gyfun Gymraeg Glantaf
Actresses from Cardiff
Alumni of University College London